Genus Parabelminus Lent, 1943 belongs to the subfamily Triatominae.

2 species:

 P. carioca Lent, 1943 (Tc)
 P. yurupucu Lent & Wygodzinsky, 1979

(Tc) means associated with Trypanosoma cruzi

Reduviidae